United Left of Aragon (Aragonese: Cucha Chunida d'Aragón. IUA) is the Aragonese federation of the Spanish left wing political and social movement United Left. Adolfo Barrena Salces is the current General Coordinator. The major member of the coalition is the Communist Party of Aragon (PCA, Aragonese federation of the PCE).

History
In the Spanish elections of 2011 IUA made a coalition with Chunta Aragonesista, called The Left of Aragón, which gained 1 seat in the Congreso de los Diputados, rotative between the two parties.

In the Aragonese elections of 2015 IUA gained 1 MP in the Aragonese Corts.

See also
United Left (Spain)
Communist Party of Aragon

References

External links
Official page

Aragon
Political parties in Aragon